Tarku is a small village in the South Sikkim district of the Indian state of Sikkim.

Cities and towns in Namchi district